Tatjana Hüfner (born 30 April 1983) is a German retired luger who has competed since 2003.

Career
She won the bronze medal in the women's singles at the 2006 Winter Olympics in Turin and the gold medal at the 2010 Winter Olympics in Vancouver. 

Hüfner won eight gold medals at the FIL World Luge Championships, winning five in the women's singles event (2007, 2008, 2011, 2012, 2017) and three in the mixed team event (2008, 2012, 2017).

She also won two silvers in the women's singles event at the FIL European Luge Championships (2004, 2006).

Hüfner won the overall Luge World Cup title in women's singles three times (2007–08, 2008–09, 2009–10).

On 2 February 2008 she became the first woman to win five straight FIL Luge World Cup events with her victory at the bobsleigh, luge, and skeleton track in Altenberg, Germany.

References

Tatjana Hüfner hurries from Success to Success. at the Fédération Internationale de Luge de Course (2 February 2008 accessed 2 February 2008.)

Fuzilogik Sports – Winter Olympic results – Women's luge
Hickoksports.com results on Olympic champions in luge and skeleton.
Hickok sports information on World champions in luge and skeleton.
List of European luge champions 
List of women's singles luge World Cup champions since 1978.
SportQuick.com information on World champions in luge.

External links
 

1983 births
Living people
Sportspeople from Neuruppin
German female lugers
Lugers at the 2006 Winter Olympics
Lugers at the 2010 Winter Olympics
Lugers at the 2014 Winter Olympics
Lugers at the 2018 Winter Olympics
Olympic lugers of Germany
Olympic gold medalists for Germany
Olympic silver medalists for Germany
Olympic bronze medalists for Germany
Olympic medalists in luge
Medalists at the 2006 Winter Olympics
Medalists at the 2010 Winter Olympics
Medalists at the 2014 Winter Olympics